Makivik Corporation is the legal representative of Quebec's Inuit, established in 1978 under the terms of the James Bay and Northern Quebec Agreement, the agreement that established the institutions of Nunavik. As such, it is the heir of the Northern Quebec Inuit Association, which signed the agreement with the governments of Quebec and Canada.

Overview
It has a mandate to use those funds to promote the economic and social development of Inuit society in Nunavik. Makivik is also empowered to negotiate new agreements with governments on behalf of the Quebec Inuit and to represent them on bodies like the Inuit Tapiriit Kanatami and the Inuit Circumpolar Council.

The corporation is run by a five-member executive committee including a president and a 16-member board of directors. Members of both bodies are elected by the Inuit of Nunavik. The executive committee and board of directors together appoint a board of governors to act as an elders' council. Makivik's president is Peter Adams. It is headquartered in Kuujjuaq and it has offices in Inukjuak, Montreal, Quebec City, and Ottawa. It has roughly 100 employees.

However, the bulk of its financial activities have been in the form of investments, both in Canadian and international markets, and in economic activities directly relevant to Nunavik.

On April 11, 2014, Makivik Corporation and Norterra, owners of Canadian North, announced that they were in negotiations to merge the two airlines. According to a website set up the same day, the new airline would be owned equally between the two companies and "a merger would create a stronger, more sustainable business, provide better service to customers and lead to new economic development opportunities across the North. We believe the two companies would complement each other’s strengths." In October 2014, it was announced the merger would not go through.

Makivik has a number of wholly owned subsidiaries and joint ventures active in Nunavik.

Subsidiaries
Air Inuit - A regional airline serving Nunavik.
Canadian North - A Canadian domestic airline serving the Arctic.
Nunavik Geomatics - A consulting company specializing in the geomatics industry.
Halutik Enterprises - A fuel and heavy equipment firm operating out of Kuujjuaq.

Joint ventures
Makivik's joint ventures are primarily firms co-owned with other Inuit development funds.
Pan Arctic Inuit Logistics - PAIL operates and services military and air traffic radars in Arctic Canada.
Unaaq Fisheries - A shrimp trawling firm. Unaaq is the Inuktitut word for harpoon.
Nunavut Eastern Arctic Shipping - A sea shipping firm servicing Arctic Canada.
Natsiq Investment Corporation - An investment fund to harvest seals and to develop international markets for seal products.  Natsiq is the Inuktitut word for seal.

See also 
 Alaska Native Regional Corporations, created from a land claims settlement
 Nunatsiavut, an autonomous Inuit Land Claims Area in Newfoundland and Labrador

References

Further reading

 Janda, R. 2006. "Why Does Form Matter? The Hybrid Governance Structure of Makivik Corporation". Vermont Law Review. 30, no. 3: 785–822. 
 Kwan, Michael K. H. Establishment of the Trace Metal Analytical Facilities in Makivik Research Centre A Progress Report. Kuujjuaq, Que: Makivik Research Centre, Renewable Resources Development Dept., Makivik Corp, 1997.

External links
Makivik Corporation - official website
Nunavik Creations - website owned by a subsidiary of Makivik, marketing Nunavik-made clothes over the Internet.

Inuit organizations
Companies based in Quebec
Nunavik
Indigenous self-government in Canada
1978 establishments in Quebec
Indigenous organizations in Quebec